This is a list of crossings of the Athabasca River in the Canadian province of Alberta from the river's origin in the Columbia Icefield to its mouth at Lake Athabasca.

Crossings in use

This is a list of crossings in use from upstream to downstream. Crossings include bridges, ferries, and dams (road, pedestrian, and railway).

References

Crossings
Athabasca